Klara Continuo (stylized as Klara continuo) is a Flemish digital radio station that broadcasts classical music. It's just like the traditional channel Klara, a public station that is mainly financed by the Flemish government.

It is one of the digital radio networks of the VRT.

History 
Klara Continuo was launched on Sunday, February 29, 2004 as the successor to the mainly experimental channel DAB Classic, then the first digital radio network of the VRT.

Until the middle of 2006 Klara Continuo broadcast from 7 AM until midnight. From midnight until 7 AM, Klara Continuo broadcast Klara. 

Later Klara Continuo began broadcasting 24x7, while. Klara broadcast Klara Continuo's programming from midnight until 7 AM.

The station can be accessed via the digital television package of VRT or over the internet. 

Frank Deleu is responsible for station management.

Programming
Software composes the playlists based on Klara's music database. Each piece has multiple parameters, and the filters assess these parameters to make playlists. 

No two pieces of the same genre play in succession (e.g., no two pieces of piano or guitar music). At least one hour separates works by the same composer, no vocal works are placed after each other and "difficult" tracks are not programmed.

Funding
Klara Continuo is a public network and does not conduct commercial activities. Other radio stations of the VRT network may earn income from commercial activities, such as running commercials.

Klara Continuo requires little funding, because only one staffer is required. The rest of the budget goes to paying license fees for the programming software. Costs that are not allocated to Klara Continuo, such as broadcasting rights, depreciation expense and operating costs are covered  by VRT.

References

External links
 Klara continuo Live

Dutch-language radio stations in Belgium
Radio stations established in 2004